Gwak Mi-hee (born May 10, 1974) is a South Korean cross-country mountain biker and ski mountaineer, who has won all individual races of all Asian Championships of Ski Mountaineering since the first edition.

Gwak was born in Yesan, and lives in Seoul. She started cycling in 1997, and became a member of the national team in 2001.

Selected results

Ski mountaineering 
 2007:
 1st: Asian Championship, individual
 2009:
 1st: Asian Championship, individual
 1st: Asian Championship, vertical race
 3rd: Asian Championship, relay (mixed teams), together with Park Jong-il
 2012:
 1st: Asian Championship, individual

Mountain biking 
 2002:
 6th, Asian Games, women's cross-country

References

External links 
 Gwak Mi-hee at SkiMountaineering.org

1974 births
Living people
Cross-country mountain bikers
Cyclists at the 2002 Asian Games
People from Yesan County
South Korean female cyclists
South Korean mountain bikers
South Korean female ski mountaineers
Asian Games competitors for South Korea
Sportspeople from South Chungcheong Province